King Richard normally refers to the three English monarchs.

English monarchs
Richard I of England or Richard the Lionheart (1157–1199)
Richard II of England (1367–1400)
Richard III of England (1452–1485)

Although no monarch has assumed the title King Richard IV, this title can sometimes refer to:
Richard of Shrewsbury, 1st Duke of York, one of the Princes in the Tower
King Richard IV of England from Blackadder, a fictional version of the above
Perkin Warbeck (1474–1499), a pretender who claimed to be Richard, Duke of York

Other
King Richard (film) a 2021 film
King Richard, a font by Ray Larabie
the nickname of Dick Reynolds (1915–2002), Australian rules footballer
the nickname of Richard Petty (born 1937), former NASCAR stock car driver
the nickname of Dick Burleson (born 1948), former enduro motorcycle champion
the nickname of Richard Brodeur (born 1952), retired Canadian ice hockey goaltender
A character in the Guardians of Time series by Marianne Curley
 King Richard's Faire, a renaissance re-enactment fair held annually in Carver, Massachusetts